Autocrates was an Ancient Athenian poet of the old comedy. One of his plays is mentioned by Suidas and Aelian.  He also wrote several tragedies.

The Autocrates quoted by Athenaeus  seems to have been a different person.

Footnotes

References

Ancient Greek dramatists and playwrights
5th-century BC Athenians